Lukeman Ekow Baidoo (born 20 June 1991), who performs under the stage name Teephlow, is a Ghanaian award-winning hip hop recording artist. He was first noted at the maiden edition of the 2012 "Next Big Thing in GH Hip Hop" Talent Hunt Show. He released his debut single, The Warning, in 2014 featuring Sarkodie.

Early life
Teephlow last of six children was born in Kotokuraba, a township in Central Region capital Cape Coast to Mr Mohammed Baidoo an educationist and Mrs Khadija Baidoo, a businesswoman. He attended Ekumfi T.I Ahmadiyya Senior High School and earned a BSC Quantity Surveying and Construction Economics from the Kwame Nkrumah University of Science and Technology.

Musical career

2012–15: Early beginnings
Teephlow began his music career in his tertiary days, rapping on campus building a strong fanbase at the Kwame Nkrumah University of Science and Technology. He gained national recognition during the Maiden Edition of the "Next Big Thing in Gh Hip-Hop" where he came out as the first runner-up. He was signed by Ghanaian producer Hammer of the Last Two Music Group, after the talent hunt show. He had a first taste of exposure when Hammer featured him on Kwaw Kese's song "Swedru Agona"and released his first single "The Warning" under the Last Two Label in 2014.
. Teephlow is currently with TeePhlow Music/Revolve records which is his own creation and is managed by his blood brothers Ibrahim Kwame Baidoo ( Artist Manager) who has been his road manager since 2013 and Hameed Baidoo ( Brand and Creative Development). He has Kwame Asante as his official DJ and Elorm Beenie as the project publicist.

2016–17: Phlowducation EP
In 2017, Teephlow released his debut tape “The Phlowducation EP”  with Production from SnowBeatz, Possigee, Carl Zeus, Two Bars, and Seshi as well as guest appearances from Reggie Rockstone, Edem, Epixode, FlowkingStone, Worlasi, BigBen and Novo. The EP which was launched at the Coconut Grove Regency Hotel in Accra.

Teephlow won his first award, "Record of the Year" from the 8th song “State of the Art” of the Phlowducation EP at the 2018 Vodafone Ghana Music Awards.

Last Two Departure
In December 2016, he parted ways with The Last Two Label and signed a 4-year management deal with Spyder Lee Entertainment. However he's currently under his own creation by name TeePhlow Music/ Revolve Records.

Tracklist

Awards and nominations

Competition
2012: Next Big Thing in GH Hip Pop: 1st Runner Up

References

1991 births
Living people
Ghanaian musicians
Ghanaian rappers